Jude Ekow Arthur (born 8 June 1999) is a Ghanaian footballer who plays as a defensive midfielder for Georgian club Samgurali Tsqaltubo.

Career statistics

Club

Notes

References

1999 births
Living people
Ghanaian footballers
Association football defenders
Liberty Professionals F.C. players
Seinäjoen Jalkapallokerho players
FC Haka players
FC Samgurali Tskaltubo players
Ghana Premier League players
Veikkausliiga players
Erovnuli Liga players
Ghanaian expatriate footballers
Expatriate footballers in Finland
Ghanaian expatriate sportspeople in Finland
Expatriate footballers in Georgia (country)
Ghanaian expatriate sportspeople in Georgia (country)